A horsepower-hour (symbol: hp⋅h) is an outdated unit of energy, not used in the International System of Units. The unit represents an amount of work a horse is supposed capable of delivering during an hour (1 horsepower integrated over a time interval of an hour). Based on differences in the definition of what constitutes the "power of a horse", a horsepower-hour differs slightly from the German "Pferdestärkenstunde" (PSh):

1.014 PSh = 1 hp⋅h = 1,980,000 lbf⋅ft = 0.7457 kW⋅h.

1 PSh = 0.73549875 kW⋅h = 2647.7955 kJ (exactly by definition)

The horsepower-hour is still used in the railroad industry when sharing motive power (locomotives). For example, if Railroad A borrows a 2,500 horsepower locomotive from Railroad B and operates it for twelve hours, Railroad A owes a debt of (2,500 hp × 12 h) = 30,000 hp⋅h. Railroad A may repay the debt by loaning Railroad B a 3,000 horsepower locomotive for ten hours.

References

Imperial units
Units of energy